Barjonia is a genus of flowering plants in the family Apocynaceae, first described as a genus in 1844. They are native to South America.

Species

formerly included
transferred to Hemipogon, Minaria

References

Apocynaceae genera
Asclepiadoideae
Taxa named by Joseph Decaisne